WAZN (1470 AM) is an ethnic radio station in the Boston, Massachusetts market, licensed to Watertown.  It is owned by Multicultural Broadcasting, and  broadcasts Chinese language programming, simulcast from M.R.B.I.'s New York City station.

History
The station signed on in January 1958 as WSRO, operating out of Marlborough.

At one time, WSRO was a music station.  Additionally, at one time, the station was simulcast in Gardner on WGAW (1340).  However, in 1996, the station filed for bankruptcy, and was sold separately from WGAW in October.  The new ownership gradually shifted the station to more of a talk radio format the following year.

WSRO was sold to Alex Langer in 1998.  In early 1999, the station let go much of its staff and became a full-time relay of sister station WRPT (650); soon afterward, the station lost its original transmitter location in Marlborough and relocated to a temporary site in Hudson.  In October 2000, WSRO applied to move to Watertown, operating from a transmitter location in Lexington.

The station was sold to Multicultural in 2002.  The callsign was soon changed to WAZN, as the WSRO call letters remained with Langer on 650 AM.  The move to Watertown was completed by Multicultural in early 2004. The station began broadcasting Chinese programming on February 1, 2016.

References

External links

AZN
Radio stations established in 1958
1958 establishments in Massachusetts
Watertown, Massachusetts
Mass media in Middlesex County, Massachusetts
Multicultural Broadcasting stations